Discipline is the eighth studio album by English progressive rock band King Crimson, released on 22 September 1981 by E.G. Records in the United Kingdom and by Warner Bros. Records in the United States. 

This album was King Crimson's first following a seven-year hiatus. Only band co-founder and guitarist Robert Fripp and drummer Bill Bruford remained from the previous incarnation. They were joined by two American musicians: guitarist, vocalist and lyricist Adrian Belew and bassist and backing vocalist Tony Levin. The album introduced a new sound for the band, influenced by new wave, post-punk and world music, while retaining an experimental character, helping lay the groundwork for what would eventually be known as post-progressive rock.

Background and composition 
Discipline has been described as art rock, progressive rock, new wave, post-progressive, and dance-rock.

The title of the ballad "Matte Kudasai" means “please wait” in Japanese (待って下さい). The original release of Discipline featured a guitar part on this track by Robert Fripp that was removed from subsequent releases of the album starting with the 1989 Definitive Edition remaster. The 30th and 35th anniversary editions, meanwhile, include both versions of the song.

The lyrics of "Indiscipline" were based on a letter written to Adrian Belew by his then-wife Margaret, concerning a painting that she had made.

"Thela Hun Ginjeet" is an anagram of "heat in the jungle". When it was first performed live, some of its lyrics were improvised around an illicit recording made by Robert Fripp of his neighbours having a vicious argument when he was living in New York; this recording is featured on the track "NY3" on Fripp's solo album Exposure. While the track was being recorded for the Discipline album, Adrian Belew, walking around Notting Hill Gate in London with a tape recorder looking for inspiration, was harassed first by a gang and then by the police. On returning to the studio, he gave a distraught account to his bandmates of what had just happened to him. This account was recorded by Fripp, without Belew's knowledge, as well and is featured on the Discipline version of the track (as well as almost all live versions), in place of those earlier lyrics that were based on Fripp's New York recording.

"The Sheltering Sky" is named after (and partially inspired by) the 1949 novel of the same name by Paul Bowles. Bowles is often associated with the Beat generation, which would be an inspiration for King Crimson's subsequent studio album Beat.

Live versions of "Elephant Talk", "Indiscipline", and "Thela Hun Ginjeet" included partial vocal improvisation during spoken-word parts. One such example can be found in the 13 August 1982 performance, which, as of 30 March 2021, was still available for download in both MP3 and FLAC formats from DGM.

The back cover features the statement, "Discipline is never an end in itself, only a means to an end". The original front cover features a variation on a copyrighted Celtic knot design by George Bain. As it was found to be used without proper licensing, it was replaced on later releases by a knotwork designed by Steve Ball on commission from Robert Fripp. Ball's design is also used as the logo of Discipline Global Mobile, the music label founded by Fripp, which has become the label for King Crimson, Fripp, and associated artists.

Reception

Discipline reached number 41 on the UK Albums Chart and received mixed to positive reviews. John Piccarella's review in Rolling Stone praised King Crimson's talent and artistry, particularly Belew and Fripp's "visionary approach to guitar playing", but criticised the "arty content" of the album itself, concluding, "Here's hoping that, unlike every other King Crimson lineup, this band of virtuosos stays together long enough to transform all of their experiments into innovations." Record Mirrors Alan Entwistle was generally enthusiastic, writing that the band "tests new ground and revitalises older ground"; he highlighted the "more mature" second side of the album, noting its "distinct songs that are danceable as well as disciplined". Robert Christgau of The Village Voice described the album as "not bad—the Heads meet the League of Gentlemen". In The Village Voices year-end Pazz & Jop poll, Discipline was voted by critics as the 35th best album of 1981.

Greg Prato's retrospective review in AllMusic commended the album's "inspired performances", particularly applauding the unexpectedly successful combinations of Belew and Fripp's disparate playing styles. According to Prato, "the pairing of these two originals worked out magically." Trouser Press characterised the album's songs as "unfolding musical sculptures, played with precision and rare imagination, a mostly successful synthesis of ambition, simplicity and Kraftwerkian clarity."

Legacy
In 2002, Pitchfork considered Discipline an influence on math rock and ranked the album at number 56 on its list of "The Top 100 Albums of the 1980s".

Track listing
All music written by Robert Fripp, Adrian Belew, Tony Levin and Bill Bruford. Lyrics by Adrian Belew.

Personnel
King Crimson 
Adrian Belew – electric guitar, guitar synthesizer, lead vocals
Robert Fripp – electric guitar, guitar synthesizer, devices
Tony Levin – Chapman Stick, bass guitar, backing vocals 
Bill Bruford – drums, slit drum, percussion
Technical
Rhett Davies – production
Nigel Mills – assistant engineer
Graham Davies – gear
Peter Saville – graphic design
John Kyrk – knotwork (uncredited; 1981, 1986 and 1989 issues only)
Steve Ball – knotwork (2001 issue onwards)
Paddy Spinks – strategic management

Charts

References

External links
 
 Wiki with song lyrics at fan-site  Elephant Talk (inspired by Discipline's "Elephant Talk")

1981 albums
Albums produced by Rhett Davies
King Crimson albums
E.G. Records albums
Virgin Records albums
Warner Records albums
New wave albums by English artists